Events in the year 2004 in Greece.

Incumbents

Events

January

February

March
 March 7 – Greek legislative election, 2004, Kostas Karamanlis, nephew of Konstantinos Karamanlis has been elected Prime Minister of Greece defeating George Papandreou.
 March 25 – The Olympic Flame was ignited at Olympia, Greece and it took it across the continents and return to Athens, Greece.

April

May

June

July

August
 August 13 – Athens host the 2004 Summer Olympics, beginning with the opening ceremony, and making the first city to bring the Olympics back to their birthplace. ATHOC President Gianna Angelopoulos-Daskalaki is the first woman to make a welcome home speech followed by the IOC President Jacques Rogge to make a speech and addressing to the athletes. And the Greek President Konstantinos Stephanopoulos is the first Head of state to open the Games of the XXVIII Olympiad of the modern era. Accompanied by Adjutant of the Hellenic Air Force Colonel Georgios Dritsakos.

September

October

November

December
 December – European Commission issues formal warning after Greece found to have falsified budget deficit data in run-up to joining eurozone.

References

 
Years of the 21st century in Greece
Greece
2000s in Greece
Greece